The Eurasian magpie or common magpie (Pica pica) is a resident breeding bird throughout the northern part of the Eurasian continent. It is one of several birds in the crow family (corvids) designated magpies, and belongs to the Holarctic radiation of "monochrome" magpies. In Europe, "magpie" is used by English speakers as a synonym for the Eurasian magpie: the only other magpie in Europe is the Iberian magpie (Cyanopica cooki), which is limited to the Iberian Peninsula.

The Eurasian magpie is one of the most intelligent birds, and it is believed to be one of the most intelligent of all non-human animals. The expansion of its nidopallium is approximately the same in its relative size as the brain of chimpanzees, gorillas, orangutans and humans. It is the only bird known to pass the mirror test, along with very few other non-avian species.

Taxonomy and systematics
The magpie was described and illustrated by Swiss naturalist Conrad Gessner in his Historiae animalium of 1555. In 1758 Linnaeus included the species in the 10th edition of his Systema Naturae under the binomial name Corvus pica. The magpie was moved to a separate genus Pica by the French zoologist Mathurin Jacques Brisson in 1760. Pica is the Classical Latin word for this magpie.

The Eurasian magpie is almost identical in appearance to the North American black-billed magpie (Pica hudsonia) and at one time the two species were considered to be conspecific. In 2000, the American Ornithologists' Union decided to treat the black-billed magpie as a separate species based on studies of the vocalization and behaviour that indicated that the black-billed magpie was closer to the yellow-billed magpie (Pica nuttalli) than to the Eurasian magpie.

The gradual clinal variation over the large geographic range and the intergradation of the different subspecies means that the geographical limits, and acceptance of the various subspecies, vary between authorities. The International Ornithological Congress recognises six subspecies (a seventh, P. p. hemileucoptera, is included in P. p. bactriana):
 P. p. fennorum – Lönnberg, 1927: northern Scandinavia and northwest Russia
 P. p. pica – (Linnaeus, 1758): British Isles and southern Scandinavia east to Russia, south to Mediterranean, including most islands
 P. p. melanotos – A.E. Brehm, 1857: Iberian Peninsula
 P. p. bactriana – Bonaparte, 1850: Siberia east to Lake Baikal, south to Caucasus, Iraq, Iran, Central Asia and Pakistan
 P. p. leucoptera – Gould, 1862: southeast Russia and northeast China
 P. p. camtschatica – Stejneger, 1884: northern Sea of Okhotsk, and Kamchatka Peninsula in Russian Far East

Others now considered as distinct species:
 P. mauritanica – Malherbe, 1845: North Africa (Morocco, northern Algeria and Tunisia) (now considered a separate species, the Maghreb magpie)
 P. asirensis – Bates, 1936: southwest Saudi Arabia (now considered a separate species, the Asir magpie)
 P. serica – Gould, 1845: east and south China, Taiwan, north Myanmar, north Laos and north Vietnam (now considered a separate species, the Oriental magpie)
 P. bottanensis – Delessert, 1840: west central China (now considered a separate species, the black-rumped magpie)

An analysis of mitochondrial DNA sequences published in 2003 confirmed that the black-billed magpie and the yellow-billed magpie were closely related to each other. The study also found that magpies in Korea (described as P. p. serica) are as different from the nominate subspecies as they are to the North American magpie species. These results imply that the species Pica pica is not monophyletic. A more recent study using both mitochondrial and nuclear DNA found that magpies in eastern and northeastern China are genetically very similar to each other, but differ from those in northwestern China and Spain.

Etymology
Magpies were originally known as simply "pies". This is hypothesized to derive from a Proto-Indo-European root *(s)peyk- meaning "pointed", in reference to the beak or perhaps the tail (cf. woodpecker). The prefix "mag" dates from the 16th century and comes from the short form of the given name Margaret, which was once used to mean women in general (as Joe or Jack is used for men today); the pie's call was considered to sound like the idle chattering of a woman, and so it came to be called the "Mag pie". "Pie" as a term for the bird dates to the 13th century, and the word "pied", first recorded in 1552, became applied to other birds that resembled the magpie in having black-and-white plumage.

Description
The head, neck and breast are glossy black with a metallic green and violet sheen; the belly and scapulars (shoulder feathers) are pure white; the wings are black glossed with green or purple, and the primaries have white inner webs, conspicuous when the wing is open. The graduated tail is black, glossed with green and reddish purple. The legs and bill are black; the iris is dark brown. The plumage of the sexes is similar but females are slightly smaller. The tail feathers of both sexes are quite long, about 12–28 cm long. Males of the nominate subspecies weigh  while females weigh . The young resemble the adults, but are at first without much of the gloss on the sooty plumage. The young have the malar region pink, and somewhat clear eyes. The tail is much shorter than the adults.

The subspecies differ in their size, the amount of white on their plumage and the colour of the gloss on their black feathers. The Asian subspecies P. p. bactriana has more extensive white on the primaries and a prominent white rump.

Adults undergo an annual complete moult after breeding. Moult begins in June or July and ends in September or October. The primary flight feathers are replaced over a period of three months. Juvenile birds undergo a partial moult beginning about one month later than the adult birds in which their body feathers are replaced but not those of the wings or the tail.

Eurasian magpies have a well-known call. It is a choking chatter "chac-chac" or a repetitive "chac-chac-chac-chac". The young also emit the previous call, although they also emit an acute call similar to a "Uik Uik", which may resemble the barking of a small dog. Both adults and young can emit a kind of hiss barely noticeable from afar.

Distribution and habitat
The range of the magpie extends across temperate Eurasia from Portugal, Spain and Ireland in the west to the Kamchatka Peninsula.

The preferred habit is open countryside with scattered trees and magpies are normally absent from treeless areas and dense forests. They sometimes breed at high densities in suburban settings such as parks and gardens. They can often be found close to the centre of cities.

Magpies are normally sedentary and spend winters close to their nesting territories but birds living near the northern limit of their range in Sweden, Finland and Russia can move south in harsh weather.

Behaviour and ecology

Breeding

Some magpies breed after their first year, while others remain in the non-breeding flocks and first breed in their second year. They are monogamous, and the pairs often remain together from one breeding season to the next. They generally occupy the same territory on successive years.

Mating takes place in spring. In the courtship display, males rapidly raise and depress their head feathers, uplift, open and close their tails like fans, and call in soft tones quite distinct from their usual chatter. The loose feathers of the flanks are brought over the primaries, and the shoulder patch is spread so the white is conspicuous, presumably to attract females. Short buoyant flights and chases follow.

Magpies prefer tall trees for their bulky nest, firmly attaching them to a central fork in the upper branches. A framework of the sticks is cemented with earth and clay, and a lining of the same is covered with fine roots. Above is a stout though loosely built dome of prickly branches with a single well-concealed entrance. These huge nests are conspicuous when the leaves fall. Where trees are scarce, though even in well-wooded country, nests are at times built in bushes and hedgerows.

In Europe, clutches are typically laid in April, and usually contain five or six eggs, but clutches with as few as three and as many as ten have been recorded. The eggs are laid in early morning, usually at daily intervals. On average, the eggs of the nominate species measure  and weigh . Small for the size of the bird, they are typically pale blue-green, with close specks and spots of olive brown, but show much variation in ground and marking.

The eggs are incubated for 21–22 days by the female, who is fed on the nest by the male. The chicks are altricial, hatching nearly naked with closed eyes. They are brooded by the female for the first 5–10 days and fed by both parents. Initially the parents eat the faecal sacs of the nestlings, but as the chicks grow larger, they defecate on the edge of the nest. The nestlings open their eyes 7 to 8 days after hatching. Their body feathers start to appear after around 8 days and the primary wing feathers after 10 days. For several days before they are ready to leave the nest, the chicks clamber around the nearby branches. They fledge at around 27 days. The parents then continue to feed the chicks for several more weeks. They also protect the chicks from predators, as their ability to fly is poor, making them vulnerable. On average, only 3 or 4 chicks survive to fledge successfully. Some nests are lost to predators, but an important factor causing nestling mortality is starvation. Magpie eggs hatch asynchronously, and if the parents have difficulty finding sufficient food, the last chicks to hatch are unlikely to survive. Only a single brood is reared, unless disaster overtakes the first clutch.

A study conducted near Sheffield in Britain, using birds with coloured rings on their legs, found that only 22% of fledglings survived their first year. For subsequent years, the survival rate for the adult birds was 69%, implying that for those birds that survive the first year, the average total lifespan was 3.7 years. The maximum age recorded for a magpie is 21 years and 8 months for a bird from near Coventry in England that was ringed in 1925 and shot in 1947.

Feeding
The magpie is omnivorous, eating young birds and eggs, small mammals, insects, scraps and carrion, acorns, grain, and other vegetable substances.

Intelligence 
The Eurasian magpie is believed to be not only among the most intelligent of birds, but also among the most intelligent of all animals. Along with the western jackdaw, the Eurasian magpie's nidopallium is approximately the same relative size as those in chimpanzees and humans and significantly larger than the gibbons. Like other corvids, such as ravens and crows, their total brain-to-body mass ratio is equal to most great apes and cetaceans. A 2004 review suggests that the intelligence of the corvid family to which the Eurasian magpie belongs is equivalent to that of the great apes (chimpanzees, bonobos, gorillas and orangutans) in terms of social cognition, causal reasoning, flexibility, imagination and prospection.

Magpies have been observed engaging in elaborate social rituals, possibly including the expression of grief. Mirror self-recognition has been demonstrated in European magpies, making them one of only a few species known to possess this capability. The cognitive abilities of the Eurasian magpie are regarded as evidence that intelligence evolved independently in both corvids and primates. This is indicated by tool use, an ability to hide and store food across seasons, episodic memory, and using their own experience to predict the behavior of conspecifics. Another behaviour exhibiting intelligence is cutting their food in correctly sized proportions for the size of their young. In captivity, magpies have been observed counting up to get food, imitating human voices, and regularly using tools to clean their own cages. In the wild, they organise themselves into gangs and use complex strategies hunting other birds and when confronted by predators.

Status
The Eurasian magpie has an extremely large range. The European population is estimated to be between 7.5 and 19 million breeding pairs. Allowing for the birds breeding in other continents, the total population is estimated to be between 46 and 228 million individuals. The population trend in Europe has been stable since 1980. There is no evidence of any serious overall decline in numbers, so the species is classified by the International Union for Conservation of Nature as being of Least Concern.

Relationship with humans

Traditions, symbolism, and reputation

Europe

In Europe, magpies have been historically demonized by humans, mainly as a result of superstition and myth. The bird has found itself in this situation mainly by association, says Steve Roud: "Large black birds, like crows and ravens, are viewed as evil in British folklore and white birds are viewed as good". In European folklore, the magpie is associated with a number of superstitions surrounding its reputation as an omen of ill fortune. In the 19th century book, A Guide to the Scientific Knowledge of Things Familiar, a proverb concerning magpies is recited: "A single magpie in spring, foul weather will bring". The book further explains that this superstition arises from the habits of pairs of magpies to forage together only when the weather is fine. In Scotland, a magpie near the window of the house is said to foretell death. An English tradition holds that a single magpie be greeted with a salutation in order to ward off the bad luck it may bring. A greeting might take the form of saying the words 'Good morning, Mr Magpie, how are Mrs Magpie and all the other little magpies?' 

In Britain and Ireland, a widespread traditional rhyme, "One for Sorrow", records the myth (it is not clear whether it has been seriously believed) that seeing magpies predicts the future, depending on how many are seen. There are many regional variations on the rhyme, which means that it is impossible to give a definitive version.

In Italian, British and French folklore, magpies are believed to have a penchant for picking up shiny items, particularly precious stones or metal objects. Rossini's opera La gazza ladra and The Adventures of Tintin comic The Castafiore Emerald are based on this theme. However, one recent research study has cast doubt on the veracity of this belief.  In Bulgarian, Czech, German, Hungarian, Polish, Russian, Slovak and Swedish folklore the magpie is seen as a thief. In Hungary there is an old saying that if the magpie "csörög" (~ "ring", call), guest comes to the house. Perhaps because the magpie loved to sit on the trees in front of the village houses and signaled when a man was approaching.

In Sweden, it is further associated with witchcraft. In Norway, a magpie is considered cunning and thievish, but also the bird of hulder, the underground people.

Magpies have been attacked for their role as predators, which includes eating other birds' eggs and their young. However, one study has disputed the view that they affect total song-bird populations, finding "no evidence of any effects of [magpie] predator species on songbird population growth rates. We therefore had no indication that predators had a general effect on songbird population growth rates". Another study has claimed that songbird populations increased in places where magpie populations were high and that they do not have a negative impact on the total song-bird population.

Citations

Cited sources

Further reading

External links

 
 
 Ageing and sexing (PDF; 2.9 MB) by Javier Blasco-Zumeta & Gerd-Michael Heinze
 Feathers of Eurasian magpie 

Pica (genus)
Tool-using animals
Birds of Eurasia
Birds described in 1758
Taxa named by Carl Linnaeus